Vivian Nouri (born 10 February 1993, known professionally as NOURI ) is a New Zealand recording artist of Kurdish origin. On 6 November 2018 NOURI released her debut single 'Where Do We Go From Here'. The song debuted at #1 on the New Zealand Hot 20 Singles Chart. On 8 March 2019 NOURI released her second single 'Favorite Goodbye'.

Early life 
She was born in a Syrian refugee camp following the bombing of her family’s home in Kurdistan. NOURI and her family were granted refugee status in New Zealand when she was 3.  She began singing at age nine. Her family began to recognize her potential when she received a standing ovation in primary school for her performance of 'When You Believe' by Mariah Carey and Whitney Houston.  At 10 she was singing at local events and contests. In 2009 she won a Five Minutes of Fame competition held in Albany, on Auckland's North Shore. The organizer invited her to perform for former Prime Minister John Key and other members of parliament at the Style Pasifika Fashion Show.

Career 
In 2017, Nouri was featured in the soundtrack for the Paramount Pictures movie Daddy’s Home 2.  In 2018, Nouri performed the United States National Anthem at the Staples Center for the Knicks v Clippers game. In July 2018, Nouri competed in the First Annual Celebrity Football Game for the John Ross III Foundation alongside Snoop Dogg and Trey Songz where, two minutes into the game, she scored the game’s first touchdown. In 2022, Nouri met her new bestie from Quirksville.

On 6 November 2018 Nouri released her debut single 'Where Do We Go From Here'. The song debuted at #1 on the New Zealand Hot 20 Singles Chart.

Singles
NOURI released her debut single ‘Where Do We Go From Here’ on 6 November 2018. The single and music video premiered on Complex Magazine. In just 2 days, it hit #5 on the iTunes Charts in New Zealand and #2 on the iTunes Pop Charts in New Zealand. The song debuted at #1 on the New Zealand Hot 20 Charts and has over 900K views on YouTube in the first week. She went Number 1 on Google Play NZ and on the ‘Top Pop’ charts on Mena’s largest streaming service Anghami and number 1 in: Saudi Arabia, Oman, Iraq, Qatar, Tunisia, UAE, Kuwait and Palestine. Surpassing the likes of Ariana Grande and ZAYN. In 2019 Nouri released her second single 'Favorite Goodbye'. On 22 May 2020 she released her third successful single 'miss all ur jokes'.

References

External links 

 
 Official Nouri YouTube Channel
 
 
 

1993 births
New Zealand people of Kurdish descent
Living people
Contemporary R&B singers
New Zealand pop musicians
Dance musicians
Kurdish women singers
21st-century New Zealand women singers